Grande Saline may refer to:

 Grande Saline, Haiti
 Grande Saline, Saint Barthélemy

See also
 Grand Saline, Texas